Chaplin and Co. is a computer-animated comedy television series produced by DQ Entertainment and aired in France on 31 December 2011 on France 3. It depicts Charlie Chaplin's iconic character The Tramp, with his friends as the Kid, for the first time in CGI animation.

Premise 
Set in the 21st century, Charlie Chaplin is a shy, awkward and touching man dressed all in black, wearing a mustache and bowler hat, who is never separated from his cane.

Broadcast 
The series premiered in France on 31 December 2011 on France 3 followed by Boomerang and La Trois. In India, the series premiered on Pogo on 7 July 2012.

Episode list 

 Episode 1: The Passenger Parcel
 Episode 2: Periwinkle
 Episode 3: Skate!
 Episode 4: The Basket of Discord
 Episode 5: The Plastic Symphony
 Episode 6: Not Fast and Not Furious
 Episode 7: Love Is Organic
 Episode 8: Who Goes Piano, Go Lumbago!
 Episode 9: The Haunted House
 Episode 10: Royal Hot Dog
 Episode 11: The Rebel Wardrobe
 Episode 12: Chaplin 2.0
 Episode 13: Love at First Sight in the Department Store
 Episode 14: A Nanny in Hell!
 Episode 15: Duel in the Dust
 Episode 16: Plastic Trap
 Episode 17: Macadam TV
 Episode 18: The Shooting Range
 Episode 19: The Guardian Has Dog
 Episode 20: Lesson of Seduction
 Episode 21: Misunderstanding
 Episode 22: Love on a Platter
 Episode 23: The Wandering House
 Episode 24: Ring Girl!
 Episode 25: Park Safari
 Episode 26: Pump Up
 Episode 27: Winning Service
 Episode 28: Everyone is Looking for Their Mobile
 Episode 29: Hands Off My Teeth!
 Episode 30: Turn the Carousel!
 Episode 31: Christmas Turkey
 Episode 32: The Photo Booth
 Episode 33: Private in Bollywood
 Episode 34: Pranks and Tricks ... Me!
 Episode 35: Hidden Camera
 Episode 36: A Dinner and a Candle
 Episode 37: The Cost of the Rabbit
 Episode 38: The Battle of the Park
 Episode 39: The Tow Truck
 Episode 40: Double Life
 Episode 41: The Intruder
 Episode 42: Rabbit on the Menu
 Episode 43: A Suspicious Package
 Episode 44: The Caddy Race
 Episode 45: The Elevator
 Episode 46: A Day at the Museum
 Episode 47: The Casting Call
 Episode 48: A Dream Promotion
 Episode 49: The Handyman
 Episode 50: Duel on the Floor
 Episode 51: The Museum Keeper
 Episode 52: The Valet
 Episode 53: The Opening
 Episode 54: Laser Duel
 Episode 55: Hand Games
 Episode 56: Superstition
 Episode 57: Love at the Beach
 Episode 58: The Music Lesson
 Episode 59: The Fines Chicken
 Episode 60: Steering Wheel Ace
 Episode 61: The Rebel Fuse
 Episode 62: Code of Conduct
 Episode 63: Refueling
 Episode 64: Express Pressing
 Episode 65: Clicks and Slaps
 Episode 66: Unfair Competition
 Episode 67: The Poker Ace
 Episode 68: A Little Slice of Heaven
 Episode 69: The Art of Seducing
 Episode 70: A Baseball Game
 Episode 71: The King of Cleaning
 Episode 72: A Scent of the Forbidden
 Episode 73: A Wire Arrest
 Episode 74: Odds and Ends
 Episode 75: The Autograph
 Episode 76: Sushi Madness
 Episode 77: Take turns
 Episode 78: Right On!
 Episode 79: Coffee Promotion
 Episode 80: Fashion Victim
 Episode 81: Proper Dress Required!
 Episode 82: Micmac at the Laundromat
 Episode 83: Home Cinema
 Episode 84: Full Back
 Episode 85: The Next Bus
 Episode 86: The Kite
 Episode 87: High Surveillance
 Episode 88: Vertigo of Love
 Episode 89: The Treasure Hunt
 Episode 90: A Perfect Ad
 Episode 91: Let's Stay Zen!
 Episode 92: The Customer Is King
 Episode 93: Don't Let Your Dog Hang Out!
 Episode 94: The Bike Taxi
 Episode 95: A Great Ballet Blow
 Episode 96: A Tailored Role
 Episode 97: The Hiccup Attack
 Episode 98: The Preview
 Episode 99: Alternative route
 Episode 100: Thief Despite Himself
 Episode 101: The Flea Trainer
 Episode 102: Paranoia
 Episode 103: DJ Kakophony
 Episode 104: One Dog Can Hide Another

See also
List of Indian animated television series

References

External links 
 
 Interview with producer by France Info
 Record of the series on Programme TV

2010s French animated television series
2011 French television series debuts
2011 French television series endings
Indian children's animated comedy television series
French children's animated comedy television series
French computer-animated television series
Cultural depictions of Charlie Chaplin
2011 Indian television series debuts
France Télévisions children's television series
France Télévisions television comedy
Television series set in the 21st century
Television series by Method Animation
Animated television series without speech